Umm Salal Mohammed is a town in the municipality of Umm Salal in Qatar. The town has numerous farms, wells and a large water reservoir which is filled during the rainy season.

Geography
The town is bordered by Umm Salal Ali to the north, and Al Kharaitiyat to the south. Qatar's capital, Doha, is relatively close, located 21 km to the south. Other distances include Al Khor – 23 km to the north, Al Wakrah – 22.4 km to the south, Zubarah – 52 km to the northwest, and Dukhan – 65.2 km to the west.

History
Umm Salal Mohammed was initially founded around 1910 by its namesake, Sheikh Mohammed bin Jassim Al Thani. He designed and oversaw the construction of the town after he had decided to refurbish the Barzan Towers to serve as his winter residence as well as an outpost to scout for incoming Ottoman troops.

Visitor attractions
Umm Salal Muhammad is a small town in the center of the country and is different from most of the other urban developments in Qatar. The historic Barzan Towers are situated on a low hill called Jebel Lusail in Umm Salal Muhammad. This location was chosen for its vantage point of the town and because the relatively high winds provided a cooling effect to those keeping watch. The towers date back to 1895 and its enclosed site was excavated by a Danish archaeological team in 1958.

Qatar's largest mall, Doha Festival City, was partially opened in Umm Salal Mohammed in April 2017. Valued at QR 6.4 billion, the mall will eventually have 540 retail stores covering an area of 244,000 m².

Mohammed bin Jassim Park opened to the public in May 2015. It spans an area of 5,988 m² and features a cafeteria, children's play area and 13 different species of plants.

Industry
Delta Doha Corporation, an oilfield equipment designer and manufacturer, was founded in the town in 1995 with its initial facilities being situated on a 9,000 m² plot of land.

The town hosts Umm Salal Nursery, one of the region's most sizable plant nurseries. It has played an important role in Qatar's preparations to host the 2022 FIFA World Cup, growing the turf and trees required for stadia and their surrounding areas. It is spread over an area of 880,000 m² and in February 2018 had within it 16,000 trees and about 679,000 shrubs.

Transport
Currently, the elevated Umm Salal Mohammed Metro Station is under construction, having been launched during Phase 2A. Once completed, it will be part of Doha Metro's Green Line.

Qatar National Master Plan
The Qatar National Master Plan (QNMP) is described as a "spatial representation of the Qatar National Vision 2030". As part of the QNMP's Urban Centre plan, which aims to implement development strategies in 28 central hubs that will serve their surrounding communities, Umm Salal Mohammed has been designated a Town Centre, which is the third-highest designation. It is the only Urban Centre in the municipality. 

The existing site of the proposed Town Centre is largely undeveloped and situated between two metro stations on Al Shamal Highway. It will have a higher density of buildings than the town of Umm Salal Mohammed as well as distinguishable landmarks. Due to its close proximity to two metro stations, the area will have relatively high pedestrian accessibility. Among the new buildings planned are a 96,152 m² girls' primary and secondary school, a kindergarten, a youth centre and a 28,189 m² town park.

Education

A number of private international schools have a presence in Umm Salal Mohammed, such as the Royal Grammar School, Guildford, which opened to students in September 2016, in addition to the Qatar Finland International School and the International School of London Qatar.

Schools in Umm Salal Mohammed include:

References

Populated places in Umm Salal